The Chen Yet-Sen Family Foundation (CYSFF) is a Hong Kong-administered charitable institution established in 2003 by the Chen family, with a dual focus on childhood literacy and vision correction - two fields central to the educational development of people throughout their lives. CYSFF works closely with a variety of non-profit organizations to help them implement "innovative" and "cost effective" programs.

Concept

The Chen Yet-Sen Family Foundation is predominantly a grant-making institution, which backs long-term projects. The Foundation also initiates its own projects and research, and works with non-profit organisations to improve their effectiveness.

Since its inception, CYSFF has worked on around 95 projects in high-need areas in China, Hong Kong and Ghana. The Foundation's grant-making started in Qidong County, Jiangsu Province, the ancestral home of the Chen family.

Notable projects

Childhood literacy projects supported by the foundation include:

 Bring Me A Book Hong Kong (BMABHK), which provides libraries with quality children's books and read aloud training to parents and teachers in Hong Kong.
 The Feng Zikai Chinese Children's Picture Book Award, which gives awards to Chinese children's picture book writers, illustrators and publishers.  It aims to promote the importance of early childhood literacy and to encourage the growth of children’s picture books in China.
 The Stone Soup Happy Reading Alliance (SSHRA) focusses on instilling China’s youth with a love on reading, stressing that schools should offer children a wide variety of books, scheduled reading time, and engaged teaching staff who share a passion for reading.

Vision correction and eyecare projects include:

 Vision For A Nation (VFAN), which led to the provision of free screening and treatment from nurses in basic local clinics in Rwanda, making it the first developing country in the world to provide affordable eye care for all.
 Clearly, a campaign to educate the public and world leaders about the scale and implications of the global problem of poor vision, which led to the founding of the UN Friends of Vision group. In July 2021, the UN unanimously passed a resolution pledging universal access to eyecare by 2030. Ambassador Rabab Fatima of Bangladesh introduced the legislation on behalf of the Friends of Vision group.
 The 2021 ENGINE trials, co-funded by the Wellcome Trust, which is a five-year research project exploring the connection between vision care and development.

See also

Venture philanthropy
Literacy
Qidong City

References

External links
 The Chen Yet-Sen Family Foundation website
 Bring Me A Book Hong Kong website
 Feng Zikai Children's Picture Book Award website
 Stone Soup Happy Reading Alliance website

Charities based in Hong Kong
Foundations based in Hong Kong
Literacy advocates